Andrew Atagotaaluk was the Bishop of The Arctic and the first Inuk diocesan bishop in the Anglican Communion. His successor was David Parsons.

Notes

 

Inuit from Nunavut
Anglican bishops of The Arctic
21st-century Anglican Church of Canada bishops
Living people
Year of birth missing (living people)
People from Pangnirtung